Calculator is a basic calculator application made by Apple Inc. and bundled with its macOS, iOS, and watchOS operating systems. It has three modes: basic, scientific, and programmer. The basic mode includes a number pad, buttons for adding, subtracting, multiplying, and dividing, as well as memory keys. Scientific mode supports exponents and trigonometric functions, and programmer mode gives the user access to more options related to computer programming.

The Calculator program has a long associated history with the beginning of the Macintosh platform, where a simple four-function calculator program was a standard desk accessory from the earliest system versions. Though no higher math capability was included, third-party developers provided upgrades, and Apple released the Graphing Calculator application with the first PowerPC release (7.1.2) of the Mac OS, and it was a standard component through Mac OS 9. Apple also ships a different application with macOS called Grapher for this purpose.

A calculator function has been included with iOS since its launch on iPhone and iPod Touch. However, iPads have never had a first party calculator application. A native calculator function was added to the Apple Watch with watchOS 6, which included a dedicated button for calculating tips.

Features
Calculator has Reverse Polish notation support, and can also speak the buttons pressed and result returned.

The calculator also includes some basic conversion functions to convert between units in the following categories:

Area
Currency (exchange rates may be updated over the Internet)
Energy or Work
Temperature
Length
Speed
Pressure
Weight/Mass
Power
Volume
Since the release of Mac OS X Leopard, simple arithmetic functions can be calculated from the Spotlight feature. They include the standard addition, subtraction, multiplication, and division operations, with exponentiation and the use of the percent sign to denote percentage.

A Dashboard Calculator widget was included in all versions of macOS from Mac OS X Tiger onwards until Mojave, after which Dashboard was discontinued. It only has the basic mode of its desktop counterpart. With the release of OS X Yosemite, unit conversion functions were added to the Spotlight calculator, as well as a simple calculator widget available in the Notification Center.

History

The Calculator appeared first as a desk accessory in first version of Macintosh System for the 1984 Macintosh 128k. Its original incarnation was developed by Chris Espinosa and its appearance was designed, in part, by Steve Jobs when Espinosa, flustered by Jobs's dissatisfaction with all of his prototype designs, conceived an application called The Steve Jobs Roll Your Own Calculator Construction Set that allowed Jobs to tailor the look of the calculator to his liking. Its design was maintained with the same basic math operations until the final release of classic Mac OS in 2001.

The app's absence on the iPad 
The Calculator app is not available on any of Apple's iPad devices. This is the result of a misunderstanding during the iPad's software development between Steve Jobs and Scott Forstall, Apple's software chief at the time. Forstall thought that he should just scale the iPhone Calculator app to fit the iPad proportions. One month before the first-generation iPad's release, Jobs asked him about the new Calculator design adapted for the iPad, which had not been developed. He was dissatisfied with the app, saying it "looks awful", and eventually prohibited it from being released.

, Apple has not released an official calculator app for the iPad because its development has been a low priority at the company since then. In 2020, American tech YouTuber Marques Brownlee (or MKBHD) interviewed Craig Federighi and asked him why the iPad still does not have a default calculator app, and he said, "That day may come."

References

Classic Mac OS software
macOS software
macOS
iOS
IOS-based software made by Apple Inc.
Software calculators
Mathematical software